State Road 483 (NM 483) is a  state highway in the US state of New Mexico. NM 483's southern terminus is at U.S. Route 62 (US 62) and US 180 in Arkansas Junction, and the northern terminus is at NM 18 in Lovington.

Major intersections

See also

References

483
Transportation in Lea County, New Mexico